The 1920 Tour de France was the 14th edition of the Tour de France, taking place from 27 June to 27 July. It was won by Belgian Philippe Thys, making him the first cyclist to win the Tour de France three times. The Belgians dominated this Tour: 12 of the 15 stages were won by Belgians, and the first eight cyclists in the final classification were Belgian.

Innovations and changes
The 1919 Tour de France had been more difficult than before because of the influence of World War I on the roads and the cyclists, but in 1920, things were going back to normal, although the overall speed was only marginally higher than in 1919, the slowest Tour de France in history. In 1919 only 67 cyclists started the race, but in 1920 this had increased to 113. Although the war was over, the cycling companies were not yet able to sponsor the cyclists in the way they did before the war, so they again bundled their forces under the nickname La Sportive. The cyclists were divided in two categories, this time named 1ère classe (first class), the professionals, and 2ème classe (second class), the amateurs.

The 1920 Tour de France used the same formula as since 1910, that would also be used until 1924: fifteen stages, in total around 5000 km, around the perimeter of France, starting and finishing in Paris. In 1919, Philippe Thys had been in poor physical condition, and he did not even finish the first stage. He was ridiculed in the newspaper, and trained hard in the winter to be in better shape in 1920.

Participants

There were 138 cyclists signed up for the race, of which 113 started the first stage. 31 of those were in the first class, the other 82 in the second class.

Favourites were Eugène Christophe, Louis Mottiat, Philippe Thys, Gaetano Belloni, Jean Alavoine and Henri Pélissier.

Race overview

The 1920 Tour de France is described as a boring race. The weather was extremely hot, and after four stages already 65 of the 113 cyclists had quit.
French favourites stopped the race early. Eugène Christophe in the 7th stage because of back pain, Jean Alavoine in the 2nd stage and Francis Pélissier in the 3rd stage. Henri Pélissier started well by winning the third stage and the fourth stage, and was the main threat for Philippe Thys who was leading the race. Then, in the 5th stage, Henri Pélissier was penalised with two minutes for throwing away a flat tire illegally. Pélissier objected to the penalty, and immediately stopped the race. Henri Desgrange mentioned that Henri Pélissier was not tough enough, and would never win the Tour de France. He would later win the 1923 edition.

The first five stages finished in a group, and multiple cyclists were leading the race with the same aggregate time. In fact, twelve of the fifteen stages finished with a group. Tour organiser Henri Desgrange did not like this, as he wanted the cyclists to ride as individuals. Thys was leading the race after the fifth stage, in the same time as Émile Masson.
In the sixth and seventh stage over the Pyrenees, Thys rode economically. He kept close to cyclists who could be a threat, but did not ride away. After those two stages, he led with almost half an hour before Hector Heusghem. The next stage he won, half an hour before Heusghem, so now his lead was one hour. Although Heusghem won stage nine, he did not win back any time on Thys who finished third in the same time.
The yellow jersey had been introduced already in 1919, but in 1920 the organisation had not awarded the jersey in the first eight stages. After Thys was still leading in stage nine, he received the yellow jersey. Tour organiser Desgrange was so unhappy with the lack of battle in the race, that he wanted to stop the race after the tenth stage, but was convinced to let the race continue.

The Belgians had dominated the race. Honoré Barthélémy was the best French cyclist at the eighth place. He had many falls during the race, broke his wrist and dislocated his shoulder. Barthélémy turned his handlebars up, so he did not have to bend his back. When he reached Paris, the French crowd considered him a hero.

The race was won by Belgian Philippe Thys. Thys had been in every breakaway, finished in the top five in every stage, winning four stages and coming in second seven times.

Results

In each stage, all cyclists started together. The cyclist who reached the finish first, was the winner of the stage.
The time that each cyclist required to finish the stage was recorded. For the general classification, these times were added up; the cyclist with the least accumulated time was the race leader. From the ninth stage on, the leader in the general classification was identified by the yellow jersey.

Stage results

General classification
The final general classification, calculated by adding the stages times, was won by Philippe Thys.

Notes

References

Bibliography

External links

 
Tour de France
Tour de France by year
Tour de France
Tour de France
Tour de France